The .401 Winchester Self-Loading (also called .401SL or .401WSL) is an American rifle cartridge.

Description and performance

Winchester introduced the .401SL in the Winchester '10 self-loading rifle as a supplement to the Winchester '07 and the .351SL in their offering of hi-power, self-loading rifles. The only chambering available in the Winchester Model 1910, the .401SL was used by France, Russia, and American company security forces in the First World War.

The .401SL proved powerful enough for both deer and other large game at ranges under 150 yards. Both 200gr and 250gr bullet weights were offered by Winchester and other ammunition manufacturers as factory loadings. With extra available detachable magazines holding 4-rounds each, the Model 1910 could provide substantial firepower for the big-game hunter. This feature helped promote the use of the .401SL on dangerous game such as moose and grizzly bear in spite of the lack of controlled expansion bullet designs, which doubtlessly would have improved game-taking performance and the subsequent reputation of the .401SL cartridge.

The .41 Rem magnum  revolver comparison is not entirely fitting, however, as in a carbine a cartridge will often product twice the muzzle energy over than when fired from a revolver barrel.

Dimensions

See also
 List of Winchester Center Fire cartridges
 Table of handgun and rifle cartridges
 List of cartridges by caliber
 List of rifle cartridges
 10 mm caliber
 .40 S&W
 10mm Auto
 .41 Action Express

References

External links

 401 Winchester WSL Cartridges 
 351 Winchester and 401 Winchester: Auto-Loading Pioneers
 Vintage Full Box Winchester 401 Self-Loading Ammo 200 Gr. Soft Point
 

Pistol and rifle cartridges
Winchester Repeating Arms Company cartridges
Weapons and ammunition introduced in 1910